"30 Minutes" is a song by Russian recording duo t.A.T.u., taken from their debut English language studio album 200 km/h in the Wrong Lane (2002). It was released in 2001 in Russian as 30 Minut (Cyrillic: 30 минут, also known as "Полчаса" (Polchasa), meaning half-an-hour) from the album 200 Po Vstrechnoy. It was written by Sergio Galoyan, Martin Kierszenbaum, Ivan Shapovalov and Valeriy Polienko, while production was handled by Kierzszenbaum and Robert Orton. The song was served as the album's third single off the studio by Interscope Records and Universal Music Russia in June 2003.

"30 Minutes" received favorable reviews from music critics, where some critics noted that compared to other ballads, they felt it was delicate and mellow. It was also noted as a highlight to the studio album. The song managed to chart inside the top forty in Romania. A music video was taken from the Russian version and edited to fit into the English version, which was then released.

Background and release
The song was written by Sergio Galoyan, Martin Kierszenbaum, Ivan Shapovalov and Valeriy Polienko, while production was handled by Kierzszenbaum and Robert Orton. The song was served as the album's third single off the studio by Interscope Records and Universal Music Russia in June 2003.

"30 Minutes" was not originally the choice for the group's third single. Interscope Records penned the group's "Show Me Love" as the album's third single, however after short notice, the song was dropped for unknown reasons. A music video for "Show Me Love" was released in Poland only, along with a CD single and was sent to radio stations in that country. The song was only served as a Promo CD single in Europe, holding three tracks. These being the album version, a remix and the music video.

Reception
"30 Minutes" received favorable reviews from most music critics. Drago Bonacich from Allmusic selected the song as an album highlight. James Martin from The Digital Mix called the song an "exceptional haunting piano piece" and concluded that it sounds as chilling as Siberia looks. Matt Cibula from PopMatters described the song as a "slow atmospheric ballad."

Commercially, however, the song was a failure as it didn't manage to chart in any record chart apart from Romania. The song peaked at number thirty-four on the Romanian Singles Chart.

Music video
A video was recorded and gained substantial airplay in Russia. In the video, Lena is seated on a carousel, kissing and groping a boy. There are close-ups of the boy's hands squeezing Lena's buttocks. Her skirt is removed, and her shirt is lifted, culminating in a scene where Lena's breast is exposed (where a body double was used).  Yulia catches Lena kissing him and is seen in a school bathroom, solemnly plotting and unwrapping a crude time bomb. At the end of the video, the lovers, the carousel, and Yulia are blown up.

The interpretation of the video is open-ended. It is implied that Yulia's character was in a relationship with one of the lovers on the carousel, and carries out the murder-suicide as a result of either Lena or the boy being unfaithful, though it could also have been unrequited love for either one. As the lyrics for the English and Russian versions of the song differ in meaning, the video could potentially be interpreted in different ways as a result of these lyrics.

Controversy
Ivan Shapovalov directed the video and he also directed the band's previous music videos. The video was censored on TV with the part when Katina's breast is exposed resting on the boy's chest being omitted. Also the final part when the carousel explodes because of the bomb is shortened, adding more parts when Yulia is watching them and making the bomb.

Alternative videos and unused footage showed more explicit scenes, including prolonged footage of Katina's (and her body double's) breasts and buttocks exposed and being fondled, as well as depicting Katina and her lover having sex on the carousel when Volkova discovers them.

Track listings
Europe Promo CD single
 "30 Minutes" (Album Version) 3:16
 "30 Minutes" (Remix) 5:54
 "30 Minutes" (Music Video)

Other remixes
 30 Minutes (Dave Aude Extension 119 Club Vocal) 7:59
 30 Minut (HarDrum Remix) 4:02
 30 Minut (Naked Mix Moscow Grooves Institute) 5:57
 30 Minut (Raga Mix By That Black) 5:15
 30 Minutes (Dubstep Remix) 3:36

Samples
The song was sampled heavily on 'Dear Anne (Stan Part 2)' by Lil Wayne.

Charts

References

External links
 

T.A.T.u. songs
2002 songs
2003 singles
Songs written by Valery Polienko
Songs written by Martin Kierszenbaum
Songs written by Sergio Galoyan
Songs written by Ivan Shapovalov
Music video controversies
2000s ballads